Professor Ian Ramsay  (born 7 October 1958) is Harold Ford Professor of Commercial Law, Melbourne Law School and director of their Centre for Corporate Law and Securities Regulation in Melbourne, Australia. He is an academic lawyer, author, and prominent media commentator on corporate law and securities law issues in Australia.

Early life and education 
Ian Malcolm Ramsay was born 7 October 1958 in Sydney. He completed his secondary education at Killara High School, Sydney.

He matriculated to Macquarie University and in 1983 was graduated Bachelor of Arts and Bachelor of Laws with Honours.

He completed a Master of Laws at Harvard Law School.

Career 
Ramsay began his legal career with the Law Reform Commission of New South Wales in 1982 where he was a legal officer until 1984.

He moved to New York where he was an associate in Sullivan & Cromwell between 1985 and 1987.

On his return to Australia, he joined King & Wood Mallesons as an employed solicitor from 1987 to 1989.

In 1989, he joined the Faculty of Law at the University of New South Wales as a lecturer, promoted to senior lecturer in 1992. He served as Associate Dean in the Faculty of Law from 1993 to 1994 whilst continuing to lecture and research.

In 1994, he was made Harold Ford Professor of Commercial Law at the University of Melbourne's Faculty of Law. Since 1997, he has also been the Director of the Centre for Corporate Law and Securities Regulation at that university. He was Dean of the Faculty of Law from 2002 to 2003.

Boards and Appointments 
Professor Ramsay has been a member of the Australian Takeovers Panel since 2000.

He has been a member of the Corporations and Markets Advisory Committee since 2002, the Companies Auditors and Liquidators Disciplinary Board since 2004 and the Audit Quality Review Board since 2006.

Ramsay was appointed Officer of the Order of Australia (AO) in the 2023 Australia Day Honours for "distinguished service to the law, to regulatory bodies, to tertiary education, and to law reform".

Publications 
Ramsay has published numerous articles and books which include:
 Education and the Law (with A. Shorten) (1996)
 Corporate Governance and the Duties of Company Directors (editor) (1997)
 Securities Regulation (co-editor) (1998)
 Company Directors' Liability for Insolvent Trading (editor) (2000)
 Commercial Applications of Company Law in Malaysia (jointly) (2002)
 Commercial Applications of Company Law in New Zealand (jointly) (2002)
 Key Developments in Corporate Law and Trusts Law (editor) (2002)
 Experts' Reports in Corporate Transactions (jointly) (2003)
 Company Directors: Principles of Law and Corporate Governance (jointly) (2005)
 Ford's Principles of Corporations Law (jointly) (13th ed., 2007)
 Commercial Applications of Company Law (jointly) (9th ed., 2008)

His co-authors include Robert Austin (judge), Bob Baxt, Pamela Hanrahan and Rosemary Langford.

Personal life
Ramsay married Megan Scannell on 8 August 1987. They have a son and a daughter.

References 

Australian legal scholars
Living people
1958 births
Harvard Law School alumni
Sullivan & Cromwell associates
Macquarie University alumni
Academic staff of the University of Melbourne
Lawyers from Sydney
Officers of the Order of Australia
20th-century Australian lawyers
21st-century Australian lawyers
Australian academics
Academic staff of the University of New South Wales